This is a list of people who held the "North American Heavyweight Title" under the banner of International Wrestling (IW) from 1969 to 1984. The promotion was owned by the Eastern Sports Association from 1969 until 1976. The IW promotion ends with end of 1984 season, and the title was discontinued.

North American Heavyweight Title

|event = IW show
|notes = TCW closed
|ref = 
}}

There was not a North American Title in the Maritimes again until 1984, when there were two of them.

84/04 Archie “The Stomper” Gouldie arrived at rival Atlantic Grand Prix Wrestling as North American Champion. This was a newly created title for AGPW.
84/06 Leo Burke arrives at International Wrestling as North American Champion, this title had a history with Toronto's Maple Leaf Wrestling, starting in 1982, when Leo Burke arrived there as Champion, with the old ESA/North American belt.

Sources
Title history at wrestling-titles.com

National Wrestling Alliance championships
Heavyweight wrestling championships
North American professional wrestling championships